Katherine Elizabeth Alice Hawes (born 1969) is an English female lawn and indoor bowler international.

Bowls career

International events
In 1997 she won the pairs gold medal at the Atlantic Bowls Championships with Mary Price.

The following year she represented England in the pairs again with Mary Price, at the 1998 Commonwealth Games in Kuala Lumpur, Malaysia.

In 1999 she won a fours silver at the Atlantic Championships in Cape Town and the following year she won a triples silver medal at the 2000 World Outdoor Bowls Championship in Johannesburg, South Africa.

National events
Hawes has won five National titles. At the 2021 Bowls England National Finals, she just missed out on winning a sixth title after finishing runner-up to Stef Branfield in the two wood singles, losing 16–10.

National titles
1992 Bowls England National Championships (Women's Triples)
1997 Bowls England National Championships (Women's Singles Two Wood)
2010 Bowls England National Championships (Women's Champion of Champions)
2014 Bowls England National Championships (Women's Fours)
2015 Bowls England National Championships (Women's Pairs)

References

Living people
English female bowls players
1969 births
Bowls players at the 1998 Commonwealth Games
Commonwealth Games competitors for England